Quemado may refer to:
 Palacio Quemado, presidential palace in Bolivia
 Quemado, New Mexico, unincorporated community in New Mexico
 Quemado, Texas, census-designated place in Texas
 Quemado, beach in Al Hoceima in Morocco